The Rangers are Zimbabwean first-class cricket team that was formed in 2019, ahead of the 2019–20 Logan Cup tournament. In December 2019, Rangers lost their opening match, against Mashonaland Eagles, by one wicket. In a truncated tournament, due to the COVID-19 pandemic, Rangers finished bottom of the table, with just four points from their six matches.

Squad
For the 2019–20 Logan Cup, the squad contained the following players:

 David Brent
 Johnathan Campbell
 Manson Chikowero
 Alvin Chiradza
 Clive Chitumba
 Dylan Hondo
 Clive Imbayago
 Kyle Jarvis
 Gregory Liebenberg
 Kudakwashe Macheka
 Tanunurwa Makoni
 Sydney Murombo
 Davis Murwendo
 Brian Mudzinganyama
 Marshal Takodza
 Brendan Taylor
 Charlton Tshuma
 Daniel Zvidzai

References

Zimbabwean first-class cricket teams
Cricket clubs established in 2019
Sport in Harare